Stephen Van Rensselaer III (November 1, 1764January 26, 1839) was an American landowner, businessman, militia officer, and politician. A graduate of Harvard College, at age 21, Van Rensselaer took control of Rensselaerswyck, his family's manor.  He developed the land by encouraging tenants to settle it and granting them perpetual leases at moderate rates, which enabled the tenants to use more of their capital to make their farms and businesses productive.

Active in politics as a Federalist, Van Rensselaer served in the New York State Assembly and New York State Senate, and as Lieutenant Governor of New York. After the demise of the Federalist Party, Van Rensselaer was a John Quincy Adams supporter and served in the United States House of Representatives for one partial term and three full ones. Van Rensselaer was a supporter of higher education; he served on the board of trustees for several schools and colleges and was the founder of the Rensselaer Polytechnic Institute. He was also a civic activist and philanthropist and was a founder of Albany's public library and the city's Institute of History & Arts.

Long active in the militia, Van Rensselaer attained the rank of major general; he commanded troops on the New York-Canada border during the War of 1812, but resigned his commission after defeat at the Battle of Queenston Heights. After Van Rensselaer's 1839 death, efforts by his sons to collect past due lease payments led to the Anti-Rent War, and the break up and sale of the manor.  As the heir to and then owner of one of the largest estates in New York, Van Rensselaer's holdings made him the tenth richest American of all time, based on the ratio of his fortune to contemporary GDP.

Early life
Van Rensselaer was born in New York City, the eldest child of Stephen van Rensselaer II, the ninth patroon of Rensselaerswyck, a large land grant in Upstate New York awarded to his ancestor Kiliaen Van Rensselaer by the Dutch Republic when the region was part of the colony of New Netherland. His mother was Catharina Livingston, daughter of Philip Livingston, a signer of the Declaration of Independence. His family was very wealthy, and the Van Rensselaer Manor House was a rich childhood environment for the young boy to grow up in. However, his father died in 1769 when Van Rensselaer was only five.

Van Rensselaer was raised by his mother and stepfather, the Rev. Eilardus Westerlo, whom his mother married in 1775, and his Livingston grandfather. His uncle, Abraham Ten Broeck, administered the Van Rensselaer estate after the untimely death of Van Rensselaer's father. From an early age, Van Rensselaer was raised to succeed his father as lord of the manor. Stephen's younger brother Philip S. Van Rensselaer (1767–1824), later served as Mayor of Albany from 1799 to 1816 and again from 1819 to 1820.

Van Rensselaer began attending the College of New Jersey (later Princeton); since it was near to battles of the ongoing American Revolution, he was later sent to Harvard College, from which he graduated Phi Beta Kappa with an A.B. degree in 1782.

Early career
On his 21st birthday, Van Rensselaer took possession of Rensselaerswyck, his family's 1,200 square mile (3,072 km2) estate, and began a long tenure as lord of the manor. Van Rensselaer desired to profit from the land, but was extremely reluctant to sell it off.  Instead, he developed the land by granting perpetual leases at moderate rates; Van Rensselaer derived a steady rental income from his property, while tenants were able to become successful farmers without having to pay a large purchase price up front. This meant that they could invest more in their operations, which led to increased productivity in the area. Over time, Van Rensselaer became landlord to more than 80,000 tenants. He generally proved to be a lenient landlord; he accepted produce such as grain and firewood in place of cash for rent payments, and when tenants found themselves in financial difficulty, he usually preferred to accept late or partial payments rather than evict them.  One facet of the leases Van Rensselaer granted was the "quarter-sale"—tenants who sold their leases were required to pay Van Rensselaer one fourth of the sale price or one additional year's rent.  Over time, this requirement became a point of contention between Van Rensselaer and the tenants, which in part led to the Anti-Rent War.

In the 1790 United States census, it was recorded that he owned fifteen slaves. By the time of the 1830 census, he had none, in keeping with New York's gradual emancipation law, under which all enslaved people in the state were freed by 1827.  Van Rensselaer later became an advocate of enabling African Americans to emigrate to colonies in Africa, such as Liberia, and he served as a vice president of the Albany Auxiliary Society and the American Colonization Society.

In 1791, Van Rensselaer was one of the incorporators of the Albany Library, which evolved over time into the Albany Public Library, and he was chosen to serve on the board of trustees.  In 1797, Van Rensselaer was an organizer of the Albany and Schenectady Turnpike Company, and served on its board of directors.

Political career
A Federalist, Van Rensselaer was a member of the New York State Assembly from 1789 to 1791, and the New York State Senate from 1791 to 1796.

He was Lieutenant Governor of New York from 1795 to 1801, elected with Governor John Jay. Van Rensselaer, over his time in politics, acquired a reputation as something of a reformer, voting in favor of extending suffrage and going against much of New York's upper class in doing so.  In 1801, Van Rensselaer presided over the state constitutional convention, was the Federalist nominee for Governor of New York, and lost to George Clinton, 24,808 votes to 20,843.

He was one of the first to advocate for a canal from the Hudson River to the Great Lakes and was appointed to a commission to investigate the route in 1810, reporting favorably to the Assembly in 1811. Van Rensselaer served on the Erie Canal Commission for 23 years (1816–1839), fourteen of which he served as its president. In 1821, he was a member of the New York State Constitutional Convention.

In 1822, he won the special election for the seat in the House of Representatives from which his cousin Solomon had resigned.  He served from February 27, 1822, to March 3, 1829, during the Seventeenth, Eighteenth, Nineteenth, and Twentieth Congresses; during the last three sessions, he was the chairman of the Committee on Agriculture.

Role in deciding 1824 presidential election
In 1825 Van Rensselaer cast the vote that likely decided the presidential election in favor of John Quincy Adams.  Because none of the four candidates received a majority of electoral votes in the 1824 presidential election, the U.S. House had to choose from the top three finishers—Adams, Andrew Jackson, and William H. Crawford.  House members voted first individually by state, and then each state cast one ballot for the candidate who received a majority of the state's House delegation; a candidate had to carry 13 state delegations to win the election. Van Rensselaer had intended to vote for Crawford, but changed his mind and voted for Adams.  His vote gave Adams a majority of the New York delegation; winning New York gave Adams 13 states in the House vote, to seven for Jackson and four for Crawford.

Military career
In 1786, Van Rensselaer was appointed a major in the Albany County Regiment of the New York Militia. He became commander of the regiment two years later as a lieutenant colonel, and was subsequently promoted to colonel.  In 1801 he was promoted to major general as commander of the state militia's cavalry division.

War of 1812
Van Rensselaer's militia experience led to an appointment to command troops during the War of 1812. When war was declared on Great Britain in June 1812, Van Rensselaer was a leading Federalist candidate for Governor of New York. Democratic-Republican Party leaders, including President James Madison and incumbent New York Governor Daniel D. Tompkins, devised a way to remove Van Rensselaer from the campaign by offering him command of the Army of the Centre—U.S. militia and regular Army troops massing in upstate New York for an invasion of Canada. If Van Rensselaer declined a military leadership role during a time of war, he would lose esteem in the eyes of the voters. If he accepted, he would likely be unable to run for governor.

Van Rensselaer accepted; despite having held high rank in the militia, he was largely inexperienced at leading large bodies of troops.  As a condition of his acceptance, his cousin Solomon, who had more military experience, was appointed his aide-de-camp. But the Army of the Centre consisted largely of untrained, inexperienced militiamen; under the Constitution, which stressed that the role of the militia was to enforce laws, prevent insurrection, and repel invasion, they did not have to cross into Canada to fight.

The British were in the process of fortifying the Queenston Heights that Van Rensselaer would have to attack, and his officers were itching for action despite their general's desire to delay until his troops were better trained and organized. To make matters worse, Brigadier General Alexander Smyth, Van Rensselaer's subordinate, had a large force of regular Army troops that was theoretically under Van Rensselaer's command, but Smyth refused to subordinate himself to a militia officer. With some of his officers planning to try and force him from command, Van Rensselaer decided to act without Smyth.

On October 13, 1812, Van Rensselaer launched an attack on the British position that would evolve into the Battle of Queenston Heights.  Though initially successful, Van Rensselaer's inadequate preparations and his plan of attack were clearly main reasons for what became a major defeat. He was unable to secure the element of surprise, he did not procure enough boats for his men to cross the Niagara River easily, and he was even unable to supply his soldiers with sufficient ammunition. Despite significantly outnumbering the British in the early stages of the battle, the American soldiers, untried and untrained, sometimes refused to cross to the Canadian side of the river. Once the tide of the battle turned, Van Rensselaer was not even able to coax the boatmen into going back over to rescue the doomed attack force.  His forces were badly beaten by British troops under generals Isaac Brock and, after Brock's death, Roger Hale Sheaffe.

The defeat at Queenston Heights spelled the end to Van Rensselaer's active military career; after the battle, he resigned his post.  He continued to serve in the militia and was the senior major general in the state at the time of his death.  Despite his military setback, Van Rensselaer was still the Federalist candidate for governor in April 1813; he lost to Tompkins 43,324 votes to 39,713.

Later career

After the war, Van Rensselaer continued his service on the Erie Canal Commission, and between 1820 and 1823 commissioned an agricultural and geological survey of the canal's surroundings, at his own expense. He also held many significant posts after the war. In 1820, he was elected president of the state Board of Agriculture.  Also in 1820, he was an incorporator of the Albany Savings Bank, and was elected to serve as the bank's president.

In 1824, Van Rensselaer was one of the organizers of the Albany Institute, and was elected its president.  This organization later merged with another to form the Albany Institute of History & Art.  He was also active in the American Lyceum organization, and served as its president.

When the New York Life Insurance and Trust Company received its corporate charter from the State of New York in 1830, Van Rensselaer was an original incorporator, and he went on to serve as a member of the company's board of directors.  New York Life Insurance and Trust operated until 1922, when it merged with the Bank of New York to become the Bank of New York & Trust Company.

Following the 1834 death in France of the Marquis de Lafayette, Van Rensselaer was appointed marshal for the Albany-area commemorations.  He led the parade of militia members, fire fighters, Revolutionary War veterans and others, which culminated in speeches and a eulogy by William Buell Sprague.

Higher education advocate
Van Rensselaer was elected one of the members of the Williams College Corporation in 1794.

In 1812, Van Rensselaer took part in the incorporation of Albany's Lancaster School, an institution dedicated to providing an education for children whose parents could not afford to send them to school, and he served on the school's board of trustees.  In 1813, Van Rensselaer was one of the organizers of The Albany Academy, and was chosen to serve as the first president of the school's board of trustees.

Van Rensselaer was a member of the University of the State of New York Board of Regents from 1819 to 1839, and from 1835 to 1839 he was the board's chancellor.

In 1824 Van Rensselaer and Amos Eaton established the Rensselaer School (now known as Rensselaer Polytechnic Institute, or RPI) "for the purpose of instructing persons, who may choose to apply themselves, in the application of science to the common purposes of life". Since its founding, RPI has developed a reputation for academic excellence, particularly in the field of engineering.

From 1829 to 1839, Van Rensselaer served as a member of the Rutgers College board of trustees.

Religious activities
Van Rensselaer was long active in the Dutch Reformed Church; he served several terms as a deacon and elder of the First Reformed Church in Albany, and attended numerous synod meetings and similar gatherings as a delegate.  He was active in the American Home Missionary Society, and served as the organization's president in the 1820s.  In 1834, he donated a lot at the corner of Green and South Ferry Streets in Albany for construction of the Third Reformed Church.  For many years, Van Rensselaer was a member of the Albany Bible Society, and he served on its board of managers.  He was also active on the American Board of Commissioners for Foreign Missions, and served as vice president.

Masonic Grand Master
Van Rensselaer was an active Mason beginning early in his adulthood; from 1825 to 1829 he served as the Grand Master of the Grand Lodge of New York.  His leadership of the statewide organization coincided with the rise of the Anti-Masonic Party in Western New York, and Van Rensselaer forged an alliance with the Democrats of the Albany Regency led by Martin Van Buren and Enos T. Throop as a way to blunt the political influence of the Anti-Masons.

Personal life
Several members of Van Rensselaer's extended family served in Congress including Jeremiah Van Rensselaer (1741–1810), Killian K. Van Rensselaer (1763–1845), and Solomon Van Rensselaer (1774–1852).  

In June 1783, Van Rensselaer married Margarita "Peggy" Schuyler (1758–1801), a distant cousin and the daughter of Revolutionary War general Philip Schuyler, and sister-in-law of Alexander Hamilton. Their marriage resulted in three children, all of whom were baptized at the First Dutch Reformed Church in Albany. Only one of their children survived to adulthood:

 Catherine Schuyler Van Rensselaer (1784–1797), who died young
 Stephen Van Rensselaer (1786–1787), who died young
 Stephen Van Rensselaer IV (1789–1868), inherited the east side of Rensselaerwyck and inherited the manor in 1839 by his father's will. He graduated from Princeton in 1808. He served as major general of militia. During the anti-rent troubles in 1839 he sold his townships, and at his death the manor passed out of the hands of his descendants. 

After Schuyler's death in 1801, in 1802 Van Rensselaer married Cornelia Bell Paterson, the daughter of William Paterson. Together, they had:

 Catherine Van Rensselaer (1803–1874), who married Gouverneur Morris Wilkins (d. 1871)
 William Paterson Van Rensselaer (1805–1872), who married Eliza Bayard Rogers (1811–1835), and after her death, her sister, Sarah Rogers (1810–1887), both were granddaughters of William Bayard Jr.
 Philip Stephen Van Rensselaer (1806–1871), who married Mary Rebecca Tallmadge (1817–1872), daughter of James Tallmadge Jr.
 Cortlandt Van Rensselaer (1808–1860), a noted Presbyterian clergyman.
 Henry Bell Van Rensselaer (1810–1864), a politician and general in the Union Army during the American Civil War, who married Elizabeth Ray King, a granddaughter of Rufus King.
 Cornelia Paterson Van Rensselaer (1812–1890), who married Robert James Turnbull Jr. (1807–1854), son of Robert James Turnbull.
 Alexander Van Rensselaer (1814–1878), who married Mary Howland, daughter of merchant Samuel Shaw Howland, in 1851. In 1864, he married Louisa Barnewell.
 Euphemia White Van Rensselaer (1816–1888), who married John Church Cruger (1807–1879)
 Westerlo Van Rensselaer (1820–1844), who died aged 24.

Van Rensselaer died in New York City on January 26, 1839. He was buried in a family cemetery at the Van Rensselaer Manor House, and was later reinterred at Albany Rural Cemetery, Section 14, Lot 1.

Descendants

His granddaughter, Justine Van Rensselaer (1828–1912), married Dr. Howard Townsend, a noted physician at Albany Medical College. His grandson, Stephen Van Rensselaer Cruger married Julia Grinnell Storrow, a popular American novelist.

His great-grandson was John Eliot Thayer (1862–1933), an amateur ornithologist. His great-granddaughter, Cornelia Van Rensselaer Thayer (1849–1903) married J. Hampden Robb (1846–1911), a New York State Senator, in 1868. Their daughter—Van Rensselaer's 2x great-granddaughter, Cornelia Van Rensselaer Thayer (b. 1881)—married Danish Count Carl Moltke (1869–1935) in 1907.

Through his great-grandson, Stephen Van Rensselaer Crosby (1868–1959), he was the 2x great-grandfather of Henry Sturgis Crosby (1898–1929), a bon vivant, poet, and publisher who for some epitomized the Lost Generation in American literature, who was married to Mary Phelps Jacob (1891–1970).

Through his son Henry Bell Van Rensselaer and Henry's granddaughter Julia Floyd Delafield, Stephen Van Rensselaer was the great-great-grandfather of Floyd Crosby (1899–1985) and great-great-great grandfather of David Crosby and Jane Wyatt.

Legacy and honors
With his net worth estimated at more than $100 billion in modern dollars, Van Rensselaer is counted in the top ten of the richest individuals in United States history.

The town of Stephentown, New York is named for Stephen Van Rensselaer.

In 1791, Van Rensselaer was elected as an honorary member of the New York Society of the Cincinnati.  In 1822, he received the honorary degree of LL.D. from Yale University.  In 1998, the Rensselaer Polytechnic Institute Alumni Hall of Fame inducted Van Rensselaer as a member.

See also
 Barthélemy Prosper Enfantin
 Henri de Saint-Simon
 Saint-Simonianism
 War of 1812
 List of richest Americans in history
 List of wealthiest historical figures

References

Sources

External links

Stephen Van Rensselaer III biography from the New York State Museum
HISTORY OF THE ALBANY INSTITUTE
New York history with election result 1813
Van Rensselaer's explanation to Gen. Dearborn as to why the Americans lost the Battle of Queenston

1764 births
1839 deaths
Politicians from New York City
People of the Province of New York
Stephen III
Schuyler family
American people of Dutch descent
Federalist Party members of the United States House of Representatives from New York (state)
National Republican Party members of the United States House of Representatives from New York (state)
Lieutenant Governors of New York (state)
Members of the New York State Assembly
New York (state) state senators
Erie Canal Commissioners
American slave owners
American Freemasons
People from Capital District (New York)
Harvard College alumni
University and college founders
Rensselaer Polytechnic Institute faculty
American militia generals
American militiamen in the War of 1812
Burials at Albany Rural Cemetery